Ernest Albert Pye (25 April 1880 – 10 March 1923) was an Australian rules footballer who played with St Kilda in the Victorian Football League (VFL).

References

External links 

1880 births
1923 deaths
Australian rules footballers from Victoria (Australia)
St Kilda Football Club players